The following are the national records in Olympic weightlifting in Ukraine. Records are maintained in each weight class for the snatch lift, clean and jerk lift, and the total for both lifts by the Ukrainian Weightlifting Federation.

Current records

Men

Women

Historical records

Men (1998–2018)

Women (1998–2018)

 Kalina failed the competition doping re-test in 2016 and the IOC & IWF canceled the results, the UWF however still lists them as records.

References

External links
 Ukrainian Weightlifting Federation 

records
Ukraine
Olympic weightlifting
weightlifting